The Lancer Ferry is a cable ferry in the Canadian province of Saskatchewan. The ferry crosses the South Saskatchewan River, linking the communities of  Lancer with Eston and providing a connection between Highway 30 and Highway 32.

The six-car ferry is operated by the Saskatchewan Ministry of Highways and Infrastructure. The ferry is free of tolls and operates between 7:00 am and midnight, during the ice-free season.

The ferry carries almost 7,000 vehicles a year.

See also 
List of crossings of the South Saskatchewan River

References 

Ferries of Saskatchewan
Cable ferries in Canada
Miry Creek No. 229, Saskatchewan
Snipe Lake No. 259, Saskatchewan